Walter F. DeVerter (August 25, 1935  April 7, 2017) was a Republican member of the Pennsylvania House of Representatives.

References

2017 deaths
Republican Party members of the Pennsylvania House of Representatives
1935 births